The Arden was a British automobile manufactured from 1912 to 1916 in Balsall Common, near Coventry. Starting out as a light and somewhat crude cyclecar, by the time production finished four years later, it had grown into a well-made four-cylinder car, featuring full four-seater coachwork.

The first model in 1912 was a 8 hp V-twin, air-cooled, 898 cc JAP-engined cyclecar with a wooden chassis.  This continued in production until 1915.

This was supplemented in 1914 by the 10 hp, with either a water-cooled, Alpha 1104 cc two-cylinder or 1094 cc four-cylinder engine.

A larger car, the 11.9 hp with 1701 cc engine was made in 1916 only.

One Arden, a 1913 Alpha two-cylinder-engined two-seat model, is known to survive.

See also
 List of car manufacturers of the United Kingdom

Vintage vehicles
Defunct motor vehicle manufacturers of England
Coventry motor companies
Defunct companies based in the West Midlands (county)